Yeon-seok, also spelled Yun-suk, is a Korean masculine given name. Its meaning depends on the hanja used to write each syllable of the name. There are 39 hanja with the reading "yeon" and 20 hanja with the reading "sook" on the South Korean government's official list of hanja which may be registered for use in given names.

People with this name include:
Hwang Yeon-seok (born 1973), South Korean football player
Yoo Yeon-seok (born 1984), South Korean actor

See also
List of Korean given names

References

Korean masculine given names